Viktoria Suchantseva (January 19, 1949, Voroshilovgrad) is a Ukrainian philosopher, aesthetician, culturologist, poet and writer, founder of Ukrainian philosophy of music school of thought.

Biography 
Viktoria Suchantseva was born in Luhansk (formerly Voroshilovgrad). Her father was a deputy Editor in chief of “Voroshilovgrad truth” (“Voroshilovgradskaya pravda”) newspaper, mother was a music teacher.
 1964–1968 – student of Gnessin Moscow Special School of Music
 (piano as a major study). Among her classmates there were a lot of notable scientists and well-known musicians, prominent educators and public figures, such as: I. Monighetti, A. Ivashkin, M. Seckler, E. Kuznetsova, A. Sokolov, V. Efimov.
	1968–1973 – student of Piano Department of Gnessin Russian Academy of Music. Received diploma with honors. Among Victoria Suchantseva’s tutors and professional mentors were A. Iokheles, V. Starodubovsky, S. Rapoport, G. Kunitsyn, R. Shirinyan, Y. Rags, K. Rozenshild, A. Alekseev. 
	1969–1973 – student of Maxim Gorky Literature Institute (Poetry Department). Her poems were published in “Iynost’” magazine, her own poetry collection was published later.
	1970 – married Evgeniy Kozlov, who was an alumnus of Moscow State University Philosophy Faculty. They were married happily for 35 years. 
	1974–1976 – teacher at Voroshilovgrad State Music School (piano class).
	1976–1994 – lecturer at Voroshilovgrad State Pedagogical University named after Taras Shevchenko. Head of the Theory, History of Music and Playing Musical Instruments Chair, Dean of Music and Musical Culture Department.
	1984 – defended candidate dissertation under the title: “Epistemological analysis of the role of a rhythm in the process of artistic creation” (Awarded Ph. D. degree in Philosophical Sciences, specialization: Aesthetics).
	1991 – defended doctoral dissertation under the title: “Category of time in music” (Awarded D. Sc. degree in Philosophical Sciences, specialization: Aesthetics).
	1994–1997 – Rector of Luhansk Postgraduate Education Institute.
	1997–2000 – Professor of Philosophy Department of Volodymyr Dahl East Ukrainian National University.
	2000–2013 – Head of the World Philosophy and Aesthetics Chair of Volodymyr Dahl East Ukrainian National University. 
	Since 2001 – Dean of Philosophy Department of Volodymyr Dahl East Ukrainian National University.
	Since 2003 – Head of the specialized Ph. D. and D. Sc. science council D 29.051.05 (specialization: Aesthetics, Philosophical Anthropology, Philosophy of Culture).
	2010 – awarded with the title of Honored Scientist of Ukraine.
Currently Victoria Suchantseva is a Head of the World Philosophy and Aesthetics Chair, Head of the Institute of Philosophy and Psychology of Volodymyr Dahl East Ukrainian National University.

Pedagogical activity 
Victoria Suchantseva is a founder of scientific school of philosophy of music. In 1991, in Kiev, she defended doctoral dissertation under the title: “Category of time in music” (Awarded D. Sc. degree in Philosophical Sciences). It was the first dissertation on the field of philosophy of music in USSR. Nowadays everyone who is defending thesis on the same scientific field is making references on her monograph.

German writer Lion Feuchtwanger stated that a talented person is talented in all areas. Victoria Suchantseva has proved this by her own example. Brilliant education in liberal arts has helped her to understand philosophy itself and to spot an area of common interest between music and philosophy, which later became her main research interest. Victoria Suchantseva is an author of about more than 300 scientific works including 3 monographs. Thanks to her, a powerful school of philosophy has been formed in Lugansk. Philosophy Department of Volodymyr Dahl East Ukrainian National University is annually qualifying specialists in philosophy and analytics.

Scientific Council for defending Ph. D. and D. Sc. dissertations in Aesthetics, Philosophical Anthropology and Philosophy of Culture is stably working for 10 years.
As a Head of the Institute of Philosophy and Psychology V. Suchantseva is pointing out the following: “Aesthetics is our strongest faculty school, which is considered to be the best in Ukraine. There are eight Doctors of Science teaching philosophy and aesthetics in our department, whereas Taras Shevchenko National University of Kyiv has only two“. Scientists from all over Ukraine are coming to defend their dissertations in Luhansk. Victoria Suchantseva’s followers are mastering new trends in contemporary science. She has already trained 6 Doctors of Science and more than 20 Philosophy Doctors. Her current students, postgraduates and doctoral students not only respect, but also love their teacher. She has an indisputable authority over them. 
She has a special power, able to win over everybody around and inspire them with wisdom and desire to know. It is also noteworthy to mention that Victoria Suchantseva has always held senior posts and positions everywhere she worked.

Victoria Suchantseva is not only a professor, doctor of philosophy and prominent educator, but also is a talented manager. She is saying: "Philosophy is a kind of a magnet that "pulls out" independently thinking humanitarians from the crowd."

Scientific activities 
Suchantseva’s major scientific interests are focused on Philosophy of Culture, Philosophy of Music and Aesthetics. More than three hundred of her scientific works are devoted to these subjects. In these studies philosophical aspects of cultural analysis are described. Her unique language and writing manner are easily capturing reader’s attention. She is a brilliant speaker, who is able to speak easily and accessibly on complex philosophical issues. Being an unbelievably learned and versatile person, Suchantseva’s scientific ideas amaze with the depth of her thought.

References

Bibliography 
 Суханцева В.К. Категория времени в музыкальной культуре/ В.К.Суханцева. – Киев: КГУ "Либідь", 1990. – 183 с.
 Суханцева В.К. Музыка как мир человека (От идеи Вселенной – к философии музыки) / В.К.Суханцева. – Киев.: Факт, 2000. – 186 с. 
 Суханцева В.К. Метафизика культуры / В.К.Суханцева. – К.: Факт, 2006. – 368 с. – .

1949 births
Living people
People from Luhansk
Ukrainian philosophers
Ukrainian women philosophers